Louis A. Cella (November 29, 1866 – April 29, 1918) was an American capitalist, turfman, and plutocratic political financier. In 1896, he co-founded the Cella, Adler, and Tilles investment syndicate, alongside partners Cap Tilles and Samuel Adler.  The partnership, also known as C.A.T., dominated the Midwestern horse racing industry through World War I.  At its height, C.A.T. had a controlling interest in 25 horse racing tracks.  Additionally, C.A.T. founded the Western Turf Association, which granted Cella and his partners near monopolistic control over jockeys, bookmakers, and horse owners in the Midwest.   The partnership also had one of the largest networks of bucketshops in the US, with a presence in every major city in the country.  Cella was nicknamed the "Dago Saloonkeeper," a reference to his early start as a saloonist before co-founding C.A.T.  Cella made a fortune in real estate, commodities speculation, stock commissions, and horse racing.  At the height of his career, Cella owned five large office buildings, controlled ten theaters, several hotels, and a large network of brokerages across the US.

From 1897 to 1904, Cella and his two partners had a monopoly on the St. Louis horse racing market.  In 1905, gambling was abolished in Missouri after passage of the Anti-Breeders Act, and the partnership's tracks were legally forced to cease operations.  Following the progressive movement's prohibition on gambling in Missouri, Cella turned his primary attention to real estate speculation and the Cella Commission Company he co-founded with his brothers.  In 1910, Cella was arrested by federal marshals and extradited to Washington D.C. in the Western Union bucket shop scandal.  During the trial, the prosecuting federal attorney accused Cella of perjury, which was added to the charges against him.  In 1911, Cella and his investment partners were acquitted of all charges, after the Anti-Bucket Shop Act was declared unconstitutional.  The ruling was seen by reformers as a setback for the progressive movement.

Cella ran for a seat in the Missouri State House of Representatives but was defeated.  After losing, Cella began financing a range of state politicians, becoming a key political power in the advancement of various moneyed interests.

Early life
Cella was one of five siblings born to John G. Cella and Mary Arado. His siblings were John, Angelo, Andrew, and Charles.  His father and mother were Italians from Bertigaro and Montemozzo villages, hinterland of Chiavari, city of a Northern Italy Liguria region, at that time part of the Sardinia Kingdom. At a young age, his father and mother immigrated to the United States.  Cella and his siblings were born in downtown St. Louis, Missouri.  As a boy, the family was poor, with Cella and his siblings helping to support the family whenever possible.

Career
As a young man, Cella left St. Louis and moved to Kansas City, where he became a bartender at the old Kansas City railroad depot.  At the time, the bar was one of the wildest saloons in the US.  After a year in Kansas City, Cella returned to St. Louis, opening a saloon.  Cella's saloon became a local favorite for gamblers, thieves, and other various criminal elements.  At the age of 24, he introduced a popular dice game operating out of the establishment, which netted Cella over $100,000 by the time he was 27.  With his fortune in gambling profits, Cella became a bookmaker for horse gambling in the heart of the St. Louis business district in the early 1890s.

Cella entered the horse racing industry in 1896, joining the partnership of Andrew Tilles and Samuel Adler.  The partnership originally began with a cigar concession stand at the Delmar racetrack in 1886.  In 1892, Tilles and Adler purchased the South Side race track.  With the injection of Cella's share, the three turfmen bought out the Madison race track in Madison, Illinois.   It was Cella's idea to also build a large pool house, alongside the race track that ran for eight years.   The profits from the pool house were said to have laid the foundation for their $30 million fortune.

By 1902, the partnership had monopolized the entire St. Louis region.  Within short order, the partnership would go on to purchase jericho tracks, as well as major tracks, across the United States.  By 1911, this included tracks in Memphis, Little Rock, Hot Springs, Arkansas, New Orleans, Detroit, Cincinnati, Buffalo, Nashville, Latonia, Kentucky, and Louisville, Kentucky.  The partnership even attempted to acquire Churchill Downs, opening the Douglas Park Racing Track in close proximity to the legendary track. The experience left a bitter rivalry between the American Turf Association, which owned Churchill Downs and C.A.T.'s Western Turf Association.

At the time of his death, Cella had amassed the largest real estate portfolio in St. Louis.

Politics
Cella ran for the state House of Representatives in Missouri.  However, he was defeated and never sought political office again.  After his defeat, Cella became a political financier for local and state elections.  He financed a plethora of candidates supportive of the legalization of gambling and lobbied unsuccessfully to defeat the 1905 Anti-Breeders Act banning horse gambling in Missouri.

Death
Cella died on April 29, 1918, of a heart attack at St. Lukes Hospital in St. Louis, Missouri.  He was buried in Calvary Cemetery at the Louis A. Cella mausoleum.

See also

 Cap Tilles
 List of people from St. Louis

References 

People in horse racing
Businesspeople from St. Louis
1866 births
1918 deaths
19th-century American businesspeople